The Aaron Copland School of Music is one of the oldest departments at Queens College, founded when the College opened in 1937.

The department's curriculum was originally established by Edwin Stringham, and a later emphasis on the analytical system of Heinrich Schenker was initiated by Saul Novack.

Some of the students who enrolled in early classes of the college later became faculty members of the department. This included Sol Berkowitz, Gabriel Fontrier, Leo Kraft. Other distinguished faculty from the early years included John Castellini, who founded the Choral Society; Boris Schwarz, a refugee from his native Russia in 1917 and later from Nazi Germany in the 1930s; Saul Novack, who later became Dean of the Division of Arts and Humanities; and Barry Brook, who with Novack established the doctoral program in music at the Graduate Center of CUNY. Joseph Machlis, developed the teaching of music appreciation to a high art, and wrote the most successful series of music appreciation textbooks in history. (Machlis's Enjoyment of Music: An Introduction to Perceptive Listening has been used by more than 3.5 million students and is in its tenth edition.) Later faculty included Felix Salzer, a refugee from Austria who was a student of the theorist Heinrich Schenker and became the leading exponent of his ideas to generations of American students and scholars; and the composers Hugo Weisgall and George Perle.

Notable alumni
Arturo O'Farrill 
Marco Oppedisano
Conrad Herwig
JoAnn Falletta
Erika Sunnegårdh
George Tsontakis
Tito Muñoz
Edward W. Hardy
Vasili Byros

Notable faculty
Sol Berkowitz
Hugo Weisgall
Jimmy Heath
George Perle
Thea Musgrave (emeritus)
Leo Kraft
Karol Rathaus
Marcy Rosen
David Jolley
Carl Schachter
Stephanie Chase 
Roland Hanna
Maurice Peress
Bruce Saylor

References

External links 

 

Queens College, City University of New York
Educational institutions established in 1937
1937 establishments in New York City
Music schools in New York City